Aśoka is a 2001 Indian Hindi-language epic historical drama film directed and co-written by Santosh Sivan. It is a dramatized version of the early life of emperor Asoka, of the Maurya Empire, who ruled most of the Indian subcontinent in the 3rd century BCE. The film stars Shah Rukh Khan as the titular character alongside Ajith Kumar (in his first and only Hindi film to date), Kareena Kapoor, Hrishitaa Bhatt, and Danny Denzongpa. It was produced by Khan, Juhi Chawla and Radhika Sangoi. The screenplay was written by Santosh Sivan and Saket Chaudhary and the dialogue by Abbas Tyrewala. It was originally released as Ashoka: The Great in India. The film was dubbed and released in Tamil as Samrat Asoka.

Asoka was widely screened across the United Kingdom and North America, and was also selected for screening at the Venice Film Festival and the Toronto International Film Festival, where it received positive reviews.

At the 47th Filmfare Awards, Asoka received 5 nominations, including Best Film, Best Director (Sivan) and Best Actress (Kapoor), and won Best Cinematography (Sivan).

Plot

The film chronicles the early part of the life of Emperor Asoka. It begins with his career as a General in Takshashila and ends with the bloody conquest of the Kalinga.

Emperor Chandragupta Maurya, grandfather of Asoka, of the Maurya empire, has decided to embrace Jainism and abdicate the throne of the empire in favour of his son Bindusara. But his grandson, Prince Asoka, claims his sword. The old emperor explains that this sword is evil, and the sword demands blood and destruction.

A few years later, Prince Asoka, now a brave youth, is battling the rebellious chief of Taxila for his Emperor and father. He figures that his elder half-brother Susima Maurya, who also has an eye on the throne of the empire, has deliberately withheld reinforcements from arriving, but defeats the enemy nevertheless. Asoka returns to the capital victorious and confronts Susima. Later, Susima tries to assassinate Asoka while he is bathing. The fight among the princes makes the Emperor unhappy, and he orders Empress Dharma to control her son Asoka. She compels Asoka to temporarily leave the capital to lead the life of a common person. The Prince is disappointed but leaves nonetheless.

Asoka, alone and disguised as an ordinary traveller, rides to the south. In his travels, he meets a lovely maiden, Kaurwaki and falls in love with her. He also develops a good relationship with her little brother Arya. They are on the run from the Kingdom of Kalinga along with their faithful protector Bheema and are being chased by soldiers of the Kingdom. After saving their lives, Asoka introduces himself as Pawan, hiding his true identity. Kaurwaki and Arya are the Princess and Prince of Kalinga, who fled from their kingdom when the Prime Minister assassinated their parents and took over power. Later, Asoka and Kaurwaki get secretly married.

Soon, Asoka is summoned by his mother, who sent a messenger to tell him she has fallen ill and to come to the capital. The Emperor dispatches Asoka to quell a rebellion in Ujjaini. Before marching to the west, Asoka travels to Kalinga to meet Kaurwaki and Arya. Unable to find them, and not knowing they have gone into hiding, he is informed by General Bheema that they were slaughtered. A heartbroken Asoka attempts suicide but is saved by Virat, who later swears to protect him. Mad with grief and anger, Asoka leads a brutal crackdown in Ujjaini. The assassins sent by Susima injure Asoka in a battle, and Virat saves him. He is taken to a Buddhist monastery at Vidisa to recover.

There, he meets a Buddhist maiden, Devi, who cares for him. Asoka also survives another assassination attempt at Vidisa, this time with the help of Devi. Asoka marries Devi and returns in splendour to Pataliputra. Susima and his brothers are wild with anger from their futile attempts to eliminate Asoka. Emperor Bindusara, who favoured Susima over Asoka, becomes ill and dies. In another vigilante attack, Queen Dharma is stabbed to death by assassins sent by Susima. Angered, Asoka wants to kill Susima but has second thoughts, and Susima is killed by Virat when he tries to kill Asoka behind his back and is appointed emperor.

A few months later, princess Kaurwaki and prince Arya return to Kalinga with Bheema and have the Prime Minister executed for treason. Asoka declares war on Kalinga, not knowing that Kaurwaki is alive. Kaurwaki still does not know that Asoka is Pawan, and both sides prepare for war.

A terrible war is fought in Kalinga. The Maurya army inflicts a crushing defeat on Kalinga. Not content with the mere victory, Maurya soldiers butcher everyone in sight. General Bheema is killed after failing to assassinate Asoka realizing that he is Pawan and Kaurwaki is wounded. Asoka later visits the battlefield, where he discovers his horse, who was supposed to be in Kaurwaki's possession. With a surge of hope, he frantically searches for Kaurwaki and finds her. They have a heart-to-heart talk, and he apologises deeply for his actions. He is interrupted by Arya, who is dying after being pierced with arrows. With Arya dying in his arms, Asoka suddenly realises that his enemies, his family, and even Arya, are all dead because of him. His grandfather's warning about the sword had been correct.

The film ends with Asoka throwing the sword into the water at the same spot as his grandfather, and embracing Buddhism. The final narrative describes how Asoka not only built a large empire but spread Buddhism and the winds of peace throughout the empire.

Cast
Shahrukh Khan as Samrat Ashoka / Pawan 
Ajith Kumar as Susima
Kareena Kapoor as Kaurwaki
Danny Denzongpa as Virat
Hrishitaa Bhatt as Devi
Rahul Dev as Bheema
Gerson Da Cunha as King Bindusara
Subhashini Ali as Dharma
Umesh Mehra as Emperor Chadragupta
Sooraj Balaji as Prince Arya
Johnny Lever as Magadha soldier#1
Raghuvir Yadav as Magadha soldier#2
Suresh Menon as Magadha soldier#3
Shilpa Mehta as Queen, Susima's mother.
RajLaxmi R.Roy as Bar Girl
Vivek Sharma as Sugidha
C. L. Gurnani as Pandit
Mithilesh Chaturvedi as Kalinga Minister
Shweta Menon as Nandaneshwari
Gayatri Jayaraman as an item number
Dimple Inamdar as an item number
Suresh Oberoi as Narrator
Bomie E. Dotiwala as Devi's father
Shraddha Nigam

Differences from history
"Asoka had embraced Buddhism long before the Kaling War, and yet, as far as historical accuracy is concerned, there's a surprising result: though the whole Pawan/Kaurwaki episode is fantasy, the film mostly avoids messing around with the known facts", wrote historian Alex von Tunzelmann. There is also no historical evidence of a queen ruling Kalinga at the time of Asoka's invasion. The film also does not depict Ashoka's love for Devi. The film also explicitly suggests Kalinga as a democracy.

Production
"I was dancing in a train for a song in a movie ("Chaiyya Chaiyya" on the sets of Mani Ratnam's Dil Se..) that Santosh Sivan was lensing, and he came up to me between shots and told me about Asoka," says Shah Rukh Khan. "I could only understand half of what he said but I could see the determination in his eyes, and that, somehow or other, he would make it with or without me. That's 80% of the battle won. I was hooked."

The director, along with the principal costume designer Anu Vardhan, started working on the project two years before they started the actual shooting of the film. Though Vardhan agrees that there was no concept of wearing vests during that era, certain cinematic liberties had been taken because Shahrukh did not wanted to shoot shirtless throughout the film. "After all, it is a mainstream commercial film. During Shah Rukh's forest sequences, he wears square pieces of a blanket-like-material, folded into two and cut in between, to pass around the neck. Another piece of cloth was tried around his waist, acting as a belt. There was no stitching involved." Anu explains, "While researching for the film, we discovered that body art was a prominent part of that time. For the character of Kaurwaki (Kareena), we used different designs of tattoos." The armours and shields are worn by the artistes also form an important part of the costume for the final war sequences. Metal jackets composed of special fibre glass were made for around 4000 members of the cast. "These metal jackets are extremely light and comfortable and were made in Madras by more than 50 workers," she explains.

"I also tried to give the different parts of the film different looks: for example when the viewer is taken to Magadha (Bihar), the temples and houses have been made using black granite while when we are in Kalinga (Orissa) I have used brown sandstone and earth tones to generate a different feel. Also I worked with only six pillars in the film, it is hard to imagine that once you see the film", says Sabu Cyril.

The film was locations such as Panchmarhi (the bulk of the romance between Asoka and the princess), Maheshwar (the palace intrigues of Pataliputra), Madhya Pradesh, Jaipur (battle scenes), Igatpuri and Bhubaneswar (the Kalinga portions). More than half the film was shot indoors on the studio floors of Film City and Filmistan. The elaborate final battle scene (the battle fought against the Kalingas) employed over six thousand extras and hundreds of elephants. Some of the actors portraying warriors in the film were masters of Kalari, who used their expertise. They were the only ones to use real weapons in the filming. The song "Raat Ka Nasha" was picturised at Bhedaghat and Panchmarhi in Jabalpur, Madhya Pradesh amidst the Narmada River.

The film is also known for using minimal special effects. While Lagaan was made at considerable expense, Asoka had only a moderate budget. Sivan says he didn't want any special effects, and no digitally augmented crowds. Priyanka Chopra turned down the offer to appear in a song in the film.

Soundtrack

The songs of the movie were composed by Anu Malik. Initially, A. R. Rahman was signed in to compose the film's music, but for reasons unknown, he opted out. Malik stepped in to compose the songs, while Sandeep Chowta was brought on board to for the background score. Gulzar wrote the lyrics for five songs, while one song was written by Anand Bakshi ("San Sanana"). The soundtrack was very successful and according to the Indian trade website Box Office India, with around 15,00,000 units sold, the album was the year's one of the highest-selling.

Hindi Track listing

Tamil tracklisting

Reception

Box office

India
It opened on 26 October 2001, across 235 screens, and earned  nett on its opening day. It grossed  nett in its opening weekend, and had a first week of  nett. The film earned a total of  nett. It is the 13th-highest-grossing film of 2001 in India.

International
It had an opening weekend of $800,000 (3.84 crore) and went on to gross $1.07 million (5.13 crore) in its first week. The film earned a total of $1.8 million (8.64 crore) at the end of its theatrical run. Overseas, It is the 4th-highest-grossing film of 2001.

Critical reception
Aśoka was critically acclaimed upon release.  Peter Bradshaw of The Guardian called the film "a big, brash and deeply enjoyable Bollywood epic". He stated, "This movie's narrative gusto, its intricate, indirect eroticism – no sex, or even kissing – its lavish musical numbers and its sheer self-belief are a treat." The Sunday Times said, "it is sexy without one kiss and savage without indulging in gore and deserves to be this year's Crouching Tiger, Hidden Dragon".

Neil Smith described the film; "with elements of both Gandhi (1982) and Braveheart (1995), Asoka is a big, sprawling epic that looks every rupee it took to bring it to the screen." However, BBCs Santosh Sinha noted, "It is at this point in the film [when the prince go into hiding as per the request of the mother Queen] that Asoka is temporarily lost and Shahrukh Khan the actor takes over. He meets Princess Kaurwaki in the forest and then chases her around in a typically Bollywood way. He [Khan] is also less convincing when, grieved by the loss of life in Kalinga, he renounces violence and vows to spread the message of peace far and wide. This comes across as melodramatic. Bollywood style, Asoka finds Kaurwaki and the young Prince Arya of Kalinga on the battlefield. Prince Arya manages a dying speech before he keels over and that breaks Asoka completely." Journalist, editor and film trade analyst Taran Adarsh wrote that "director Santosh Sivan has chosen a historical subject, but added his spice and come up with a fairytale kind of a flick. As a cinematographer, Santosh Sivan's work is flawless."

The portrayal of Asoka in the film proved controversial in India. "Shahrukh's Asoka is all bluster and mannerism, with no depth. Except for the nosebleeds and the mudbaths, he is the same Shahrukh of every other movie that he has acted in. The film leaves its many complex moments unexplored and disjointed, choosing to pitch it as a love story instead of an epic tale of war and peace," an Indian reviewer wrote.

Varietys David Rooney states, "a sprawling widescreen historical epic laced with Bollywood musical numbers, melodramatic romance, spectacular locations and violent battle scenes. Coming on the heels of Ashutosh Gowariker's Lagaan: Once Upon a Time in India, Asoka provides further evidence that Bollywood is poised for wider commercial impact beyond its already substantial established niche. And while the ambling, uneconomical nature of popular Indian storytelling makes major crossover business unlikely in this case, some degree of general art-house attention appears indicated. Khan cuts a dashing figure as a soulful hunk in the traditional Bollywood mould. At the same time, Kapoor plays ornately tattooed Kaurwaki as a lively mix of flirtatious coquette and feisty warrior woman, kind of like Jennifer Lopez meets Michelle Yeoh." Empire praised the movie gave it 4 out of 5 stars. It states,"Santosh Sivan may just be the man who provides that elusive Indian crossover hit with this rip-roaring historical adventure. The fact that Asoka was such a bloody warrior is no more ably demonstrated than when the battle scenes kick in near the end, it's like Akira Kurosawa goes Bollywood."

Critics generally praised the cinematography of Santosh Sivan.

Miniseries
StarPlus launched an extended miniseries version of the film, split into five episodes from 28 May 2002 to 25 June 2002.

Awards and nominations

See also
Lists of historical films
List of historical films set in Asia

Further reading

References

External links
 
 
 
 

Red Chillies Entertainment films
2001 films
2000s Hindi-language films
2000s historical drama films
Films shot in Madhya Pradesh
Kalarippayattu films
Films about Buddhism
Films set in ancient India
Works about the Maurya Empire
Films set in the 3rd century BC
Films shot in Maharashtra
Films shot in Rajasthan
Films about royalty
Indian historical drama films
History of India on film
Indian epic films
Films scored by Anu Malik
Films scored by Sandeep Chowta
Indian historical action films
Memorials to Ashoka
Films set in the Maurya Empire
Fratricide in fiction
Films directed by Santosh Sivan
2001 drama films
Films shot in Odisha
Films shot in Mumbai
Cultural depictions of Ashoka